Bobi (born 11 May 1992) is a male purebred Rafeiro do Alentejo dog cared for by Leonel Costa of , Leiria, Portugal. As of 2 February 2023, Bobi is verified as the oldest living dog on record, the first dog on record to live past 30, along with being the oldest dog on record to ever live.

Certification
Bobi's age has been validated by the Portuguese government's pet database and certified by Guinness World Records.

Bobi was born as one of four male puppies in an outbuilding where his caretaker's family stored wood. His brothers were all buried alive after birth due to Costa's father not wanting to take care of more animals. Since Bobi blended in with the wood at birth, Costa's father did not see him when he was collecting the puppies to bury.

According to Guinness World Records, Bobi is the oldest verified living dog as well as the oldest verified dog in history, being 30 years 266 days old as of evaluation on 1 February 2023, surpassing the previous record held by Bluey, a female Australian Cattle Dog from Victoria, Australia, aged 29 years and 5 months, which had been the record for over 83 years.

Health and longevity
The owners have stated that Bobi is in reasonably good health for his age, although he has trouble walking and possesses poor eyesight. He has had a good run of health, despite collapsing due to breathing difficulties in 2018. The Costas attributed Bobi's longevity to a "calm, peaceful environment" and consumption of human food rather than animal food. His longevity could also be attributed to good genetics, as Bobi's mother lived to 18 years.

See also
List of individual dogs
List of longest-living dogs

References

1992 animal births
Individual dogs
Oldest animals